Baron Forres, of Glenogil in the County of Forfar, is a title in the Peerage of the United Kingdom. It was created in the 1922 Birthday Honours for the businessman and Liberal politician Sir Archibald Williamson, 1st Baronet. He had already been created a Baronet of Glenlogil in 1909. Williamson was the son of Stephen Williamson. who represented St Andrews and Kilmarnock in the House of Commons.

 the titles are held by the first Baron's great-grandson, the fourth Baron, who succeeded his father in 1978. He lives in New South Wales, Australia.

Barons Forres (1922)
Archibald Williamson, 1st Baron Forres, 1st Baronet of Glenlogil (1860–1931)
Stephen Kenneth Guthrie Williamson, 2nd Baron Forres, 2nd Baronet of Glenlogil (1888–1954)
John Archibald Harford Williamson, 3rd Baron Forres, 3rd Baronet of Glenlogil (1922–1978)
Alastair Stephen Grant Williamson, 4th Baron Forres, 4th Baronet of Glenlogil (b. 1946)

The heir apparent is the present holder's son, the Hon. George Archibald Mallam Williamson (b. 1972).

References

Baronies in the Peerage of the United Kingdom
Noble titles created in 1922
Noble titles created for UK MPs